Edoardo Scotti (born 9 May 2000) is an Italian male 400 meter dash runner, who won a gold medal at the 2018 IAAF World U20 Championships and was a finalist at the 2018 European Athletics Championships with the Italian national track relay team. He competed at the 2020 Summer Olympics, in 400 m.

Personal bests
Outdoor
400 metres: 45.21 ( Rome, 17 September 2020)

Achievements

National titles
Scotti has won three national championships at individual senior level.

Italian Athletics Championships
400 m: 2020, 2021, 2022

See also
 Italy at the 2018 European Athletics Championships
 List of European junior records in athletics

References

External links
 

2000 births
Living people
Italian male sprinters
World Athletics Championships athletes for Italy
Athletes (track and field) at the 2020 Summer Olympics
Olympic athletes of Italy
Athletics competitors of Centro Sportivo Carabinieri
Italian Athletics Championships winners
People from Lodi, Lombardy
Sportspeople from the Province of Lodi
21st-century Italian people